The Grange Hall in the Cannondale section of the town of Wilton, Connecticut is a historic Grange building, and is home of the Cannon Grange.

The building was built in 1899 as a community center.  It was acquired by the Grange organization in 1933.

The building is a contributing property in the Cannondale Historic District, which is listed on the National Register of Historic Places.  It is a Victorian, 1½-story structure with a "gable roof, clapboard with scalloped shingles in gable ends, stickwork peak ornament".

References

External links
Cannon Grange: No. 152 Patrons of Husbandry

Buildings and structures in Wilton, Connecticut
Grange organizations and buildings in Connecticut
Historic district contributing properties in Connecticut
National Register of Historic Places in Fairfield County, Connecticut
Clubhouses on the National Register of Historic Places in Connecticut
Grange buildings on the National Register of Historic Places